Camp Shezar (also spelled Camp Chezar and originally Camp Caesar) is a neighborhood in Alexandria, Egypt. It contains a cemetery that dates back to the 3rd century BC (Ptolemaic era).

Origin of the name 
It is spelled with French orthography as French was the most common foreign language in Egypt at the time of its inception.

See also 
 Neighborhoods in Alexandria
Camp Shezar كامب شيزار

References 

Neighbourhoods of Alexandria